Palmyra is the ancient Greek name for the Syrian city of Tadmur.

For the modern city of Palmyra (near ancient Palmyra) see Palmyra (modern)

Palmyra may also refer to:

Places

Australia
 Palmyra, Queensland, a locality in the Mackay Region
 Palmyra, Western Australia

United Kingdom
 Palmyra Square, part of the cultural quarter, location of Parr Hall in the town of Warrington, Cheshire

United States
 Palmyra, Georgia
 Palmyra, Illinois
 Palmyra, Edwards County, Illinois, ghost town
 Palmyra, Lee County, Illinois
 Palmyra, Indiana
 Palmyra, Maine
 Palmyra, Missouri
 Palmyra, Nebraska
 Palmyra, New Jersey
Palmyra station, a River Line station in Palmyra, New Jersey
 Palmyra (town), New York
 Palmyra (village), New York
 Palmyra, Knox County, Ohio
 Palmyra Township, Portage County, Ohio
 Palmyra, Pennsylvania
 Palmyra, Tennessee
 Palmyra, Utah
 Palmyra, Virginia
 Palmyra, Wisconsin, village
 Palmyra (town), Wisconsin
 Palmyra Township (disambiguation), multiple locations

Other places
 Palmyra Atoll in the Pacific Ocean, United States
 Palmyra Peak, a summit in Colorado, U.S.

Other uses
 Palmyra High School (disambiguation)
 Palmyra Palm (Borassus), a genus of palm tree
 Borassus flabellifer, a species of palm tree known as Palmyra palm
 Tacony–Palmyra Bridge, across the Delaware River
 , a number of steamships with this name
 Palmyra, a low code application development framework provided by Vermeg

See also
 Palmira (disambiguation)
 Palmyra offensive (disambiguation)
Tadmor (planet)